The following lists events that happened during 1972 in South Africa.

Incumbents
 State President: Jim Fouché.
 Prime Minister: John Vorster.
 Chief Justice: Newton Ogilvie Thompson.

Events

May
 3 – Abram Onkgopotse Tiro is expelled from the University of the North and students protest the expulsion.
 4 – South Africa and Lesotho decide to establish reciprocal consular representation.

August
 12 – Oil tankers Oswego-Guardian and Texanita collide near Stilbaai.

October
 1 – 1 Reconnaissance Commando is established at Oudtshoorn.

Unknown date
 A South African Special Forces team carry out a submarine-borne raid on the Tanzanian port of Dar es Salaam using the SAS Emily Hobhouse, a Daphne class submarine.
 The South African Police deploys to South West Africa.
 Conscription for all white males is extended from 9 to 12 months, followed by a 19-day annual call-up for five years.
 Operation Plathond, a joint South African Defence Force and South African Bureau of State Security operation, is launched to train dissident Zambians in the Caprivi Strip, South West Africa.

Births
 2 February – Hendrick Ramaala, long-distance runner.
 4 February – Sthandiwe Kgoroge, actress.
 21 February – Mark Andrews (rugby player), rugby player.
 12 March – Arno Carstens, singer-songwriter, lead singer of Springbok Nude Girls.
 22 March – Baby Cele, actress.
 26 March – Willem Jackson, football player
 3 April – Alfred Ntombela, actor.
 21 June – Irene van Dyk, South African and New Zealand netball player.
 23 June – Slindile Nodangala, actress.
 15 July – Sophie Ndaba, actress.
 16 August – James Dalton (rugby player), rugby player.
 25 August – Elmarie Gerryts, pole vaulter.
 8 September – Os du Randt, Springboks rugby player.
 16 October – Jacques Nienaber, Springboks coach.
 28 October – David James, actor.
 31 October – Shaun Bartlett, former soccer player & coach.
 14 November – Florence Masebe, actress.
 7 December – Sean Dundee, football player.
 16 December – Kuli Roberts, journalist, TV presenter, author
 23 December – Somizi Mhlongo, choreographer, actor and radio personality.
 26 December – Colleen Piketh, lawn bowler

Deaths

 14 May – Lawrence G. Green, journalist and author. (b. 1900)
 11 August – Max Theiler, South African-American virologist and physician and Nobel Prize laureate. (b. 1899)

Railways

Locomotives
 In March the South African Railways places the first of seventy Class 35-000 General Electric type U15C diesel-electric locomotives in branchline service.

References

South Africa
Years in South Africa
History of South Africa